Dirt Road Driveway is the seventh studio album from American country music artist Granger Smith.  Released on 16 April 2013, the work was published via Pioneer Music, with distribution from Thirty Tigers.

Content
Five singles were released from the album: "We Do It in a Field", "Silverado Bench Seat", "Miles and Mud Tires", "If Money Didn't Matter", and "Bury Me in Blue Jeans".

Critical reception
Stephen Thomas Erlewine of AllMusic says that "Smith's appeal is how he seems like the guy next door but it's also his Achilles heel — he seems like any old good old boy who might cross your way, which is reason enough to like him, but there's no hook to make you remember him."

Track listing 
All tracks written by Granger Smith, except where noted.

"We Do It in a Field" - 3:30
"If Money Didn't Matter" - 3:50
"Stick Around" (David Ramirez) - 3:06
"19 Forever" - 3:23
"I Am the Midnight" - 3:57
"Miles and Mud Tires" - 2:48
"Come" - 3:22
"Silverado Bench Seat" - 2:55
"Easy" - 3:36
"Bury Me in Blue Jeans" (Granger Smith, Kevin Graham) - 3:41
"Country Boy Love" - 3:32
featuring Earl Dibbles Jr.
"The Country Boy Song" (Granger Smith, Tylerr Smith, Matt Caldwell, Chris Lee) - 3:26
featuring Earl Dibbles Jr.

Personnel
Adapted from liner notes.

Musicians
 Geoff Ashcraft - electric guitar, piano, mandolin
 Mitch Connell - piano, organ
 Austin Davis - banjo
 Milo Deering - pedal steel guitar, fiddle, mandolin, Dobro
 Kris Farrow - electric guitar
 Wes Hightower - background vocals
 Todd Howard - electric guitar, classical guitar
 Chad Jeffers - Dobro
 Caleb Kelly - drums
 Tim Lauer - keyboards, accordion
 Dusty Saxton - drums
 Amber Smith - background vocals
 Granger Smith - vocals, acoustic guitar, electric guitar, keyboards, percussion, shotgun
 Jonathan Wisinski - bass guitar

Technical
 Billy Decker - mixing
 Chris Latham - mastering
 Granger Smith - producer

Chart history

References 

2013 albums
Granger Smith albums